A position representation is the parameters used to express a position relative to a reference. When representing positions relative to the Earth, it is often most convenient to represent vertical position (height or depth) separately, and to use some other parameters to represent horizontal position. 
There are also several applications where only the horizontal position is of interest, this might e.g. be the case for ships and ground vehicles/cars.
It is a type of geographic coordinate system.

There are several options for horizontal position representations, each with different properties which makes them appropriate for different applications. Latitude/longitude and UTM are common horizontal position representations.

The horizontal position has two degrees of freedom, and thus two parameters are sufficient to uniquely describe such a position. However, similarly to the use of Euler angles as a formalism for representing rotations, using only the minimum number of parameters gives singularities, and thus three parameters are required for the horizontal position to avoid this.

Latitude and longitude

The most common horizontal position representation is latitude and longitude. The parameters are intuitive and well known, and are thus suited for communicating a position to humans, e.g. using a position plot.

However, latitude and longitude should be used with care in mathematical expressions (including calculations in computer programs). The main reason is the singularities at the Poles, which makes longitude undefined at these points. Also near the poles the latitude/longitude grid is highly non-linear, and several errors may occur in calculations that are sufficiently accurate on other locations.

Another problematic area is the meridian at ±180° longitude, where the longitude has a discontinuity, and hence specific program code must often be written to handle this. An example of the consequences of omitting such code is the crash of the navigation systems of twelve F-22 Raptor fighter aircraft while crossing this meridian.

n-vector

n-vector is a three parameter non-singular horizontal position representation that can replace latitude and longitude. Geometrically, it is a unit vector which is normal to the reference ellipsoid. The vector is decomposed in an Earth centered earth fixed coordinate system. It behaves the same at all Earth positions, and it holds the mathematical one-to-one property. The vector formulation makes it possible to use standard 3D vector algebra, and thus n-vector is well-suited for mathematical calculations, e.g. adding, subtracting, interpolating and averaging positions.

Using three parameters, n-vector is inconvenient for communicating a position directly to humans and before showing a position plot, a conversion to latitude/longitude might be needed.

Local flat Earth assumption

When carrying out several calculations within a limited area, a Cartesian coordinate system might be defined with the origin at a specified Earth-fixed position. The origin is often selected at the surface of the reference ellipsoid, with the z-axis in the vertical direction. Hence (three dimensional) position vectors relative to this coordinate frame will have two horizontal and one vertical parameter. The axes are typically selected as North-East-Down or East-North-Up, and thus this system can be viewed as a linearization of the meridians and parallels.

For small areas a local coordinate system can be convenient for relative positioning, but with increasing (horizontal) distances, errors will increase and repositioning of the tangent point may be required. The alignment along the north and east directions is not possible at the Poles, and near the Poles these directions might have significant errors (here the linearization is valid only in a very small area).

Grid reference system

Instead of one local Cartesian grid, that needs to be repositioned as the position of interest moves, a fixed set of map projections covering the Earth can be defined.

UTM

UTM is one such system, dividing the Earth into 60 longitude zones (and with UPS covering the Polar regions).

UTM is widely used, and the coordinates approximately corresponds to meters north and east. However, as a set of map-projections it has inherent distortions, and thus most calculations based on UTM will not be exact. The crossing of zones gives additional complexity.

Comparison
When deciding which parameters to use for representing position in a specific application, there are several properties that should be considered. The following table gives a summary of what to consider.

See also
Rotation formalisms in three dimensions
Geodetic coordinates
Geodetic system
Plane coordinates

References

Navigation
Geodesy
Geographic coordinate systems
Geographic position